Jobs Gate is a rural locality in the Shire of Paroo, Queensland, Australia. It is on the border of Queensland and New South Wales.

The abandoned town of Tego is in the south-east of the locality.

Geography 
The southern boundary of Jobs Gate is the border of Queensland and New South Wales.

Jobs Gate Road enters the locality from the west (Noorama) and exits to the south (Weilmoringle).

The south-east of the locality is within the Culgoa Floodplain National Park, which extends into neighbouring Hebel. The town of Tego is within the national park (but excised from the protected area). The Tego springs are approximately  ESE of the town and are natural springs from the Great Artesian Basin. The springs were close to a stock route that commences in the area and extends to Cunnamulla.

Apart from the national park, the predominant land use is grazing on native vegetation.

History 
In March 1901  were reserved for the town of Tego. The gazettal of the town was published in the Queensland Government Gazette on 30 March 1901. It was originally called Tego Springs.  

The motivation for establishing Tego was its location, approximately midway between Cunnamulla and Brewarrina (in New South Wales). Town lots were surveyed and sold, and in its early days the town had a hotel and other buildings. The hotel appears to have pre-dated the town being shown on a 1896 map. By 1924 only one cottage remained with two inhabitants. As at May 2020, there is no evidence of any structures remaining at the town.

Education 
There are no schools in Jobs Gate. Distance education and boarding schools are the alternatives.

References 

Shire of Paroo
Localities in Queensland